Il-sung, also spelled Il-seong, is a Korean masculine given name. It was the fifth-most popular name for baby boys in 1940, according to South Korean government data. One common pair of hanja used to write the name may also be read as a Japanese masculine given name Kazunari.

People with this name include:
Ilseong of Silla (r. 134–154), Silla Dynasty ruler during Korea's Three Kingdoms period
Kim Il-sung (1912–1994), North Korean politician, chairman and subsequently secretary-general of the ruling Workers' Party of Korea
Kazunari Okayama (born Kang Il-sung, 1978), Japanese football forward of Korean descent

See also
List of Korean given names

References

Korean masculine given names